Maharaja Sir Sardar Singh Bahadur  (11 February 1880 – 21 March 1911) was the Maharaja of Jodhpur State from 11 October 1895 till his death on 20 March 1911. 

He succeeded his father Maharaja Sir Jaswant Singh II in 1895.  He reigned under the Regency of his uncle until he came of age and was invested with full ruling powers, at Mehrangarh, Jodhpur, 18 February 1898. But within a short period of attaining his ruling powers, he began to spend state funds on an extraordinary rate and neglected his duties in favor of pleasure, thereby depleting the state revenues and gradually causing the administration to grind to a near halt. The British Indian officials, eventually intervened in 1903 and deprived him of his ruling powers and ordered him to refrain from interfering in the active work of his ministers and requested that he reside outside the state at Panchmarhi. He had certain restricted powers restored to him and was permitted to return to Jodhpur 8 November 1905. Further powers were restored to him in 1906, with full ruling powers being finally restored in 1908. He was created KCSI in 1908 and GCSI in 1910. He was a noted polo player.

He died on 21 March 1911 and was succeeded by his son Sumer Singh.

References

 
 

Knights Grand Commander of the Order of the Star of India
1880 births
1911 deaths
Monarchs of Marwar
Indian knights